Itter  is a municipality in the Kitzbühel District in the Austrian state of Tyrol located 18.60 km west of Kitzbühel, 5 km southeast of Wörgl, and 2.5 km north of Hopfgarten im Brixental. The village lies on a terrace above the Brixental valley and its main source of income is tourism.

Population

History
Itter is first mentioned in a deed dating back to 902 as „Uitaradorf“, when the hamlet was owned by the bishopric of Regensburg.

Sights
The small castle of the village, Itter Castle, was a prison for French high personalities during World War II.
Two days before the war ended, a battle was fought there against the Waffen-SS, the only occasion when American and German forces fought on the same side during the war.

References

External links

Cities and towns in Kitzbühel District